Hollberg Hotel is a historic hotel in Senoia, Georgia that is now operated as The Veranda Historic Inn. It was built 1906 in a Greek Revival architecture style and includes nine guest rooms, heart pine floors, tin ceilings, ornate light fixtures, chandeliers, 11 fireplaces, gardens, rocking chairs and a large veranda with porch swings. It was added to the National Register of Historic Places on March 10, 1980. The hotel is located on Seavy Street and Barnes Street. According to The Veranda's website many Confederate soldiers had reunions at the hotel; Margaret Mitchell interviewed Confederate Veterans for Gone With the Wind at the hotel; William Jennings Bryan was a guest in 1908 while running for President and the movie Broken Bridges featured the hotel in 2006.

See also
National Register of Historic Places listings in Coweta County, Georgia

References

External links
The Veranda Historic Inn website

Buildings and structures in Coweta County, Georgia
Greek Revival architecture in Georgia (U.S. state)
Hotel buildings completed in 1906
Hotel buildings on the National Register of Historic Places in Georgia (U.S. state)
National Register of Historic Places in Coweta County, Georgia
1906 establishments in Georgia (U.S. state)